Tsuyoshi is a masculine Japanese given name.

Possible writings
Tsuyoshi can be written using different kanji characters. Here are some examples:

剛, "sturdy"
剛史, "sturdy, history"
剛志, "sturdy, will"
剛士, "sturdy, gentleman/samurai"
剛司, "sturdy, administer"
豪, "overpowering"
毅, "strong"
力, "power"
強, "force"
津芳, "river crossing, virtuous/fragrant"

The name can also be written in hiragana つよし or katakana ツヨシ.

Notable people with the name
Tsuyoshi Abe (阿部 力, born 1982), a Japanese actor
Tsuyoshi Arawashi (荒鷲 毅, born 1986), Mongolian sumo wrestler
Tsuyoshi Chitose (千歳 强直, 1898-1984), the founder of Chito-ryu karate
Tsuyoshi Dōmoto (堂本 剛, born 1979), a Japanese performing artist
Tsuyoshi Fujita (藤田 剛, born 1961), Japanese rugby union player
Tsuyoshi Hasegawa (長谷川 毅, born 1941), a Japanese historian
Tsuyoshi Hayashi (林 剛史, born 1982), a Japanese actor
Tsuyoshi Ichinohe (一戸 剛, born 1976), a Japanese ski jumper
Tsuyoshi Ihara (伊原 剛志, born 1963), a Japanese actor
Tsuyoshi Inukai (犬養 毅, 1855–1932), the 29th Prime Minister of Japan
Tsuyoshi Kashiwado (柏戸 剛, 1938–1996), a Japanese sumo wrestler and 47th yokozuna
Tsuyoshi Kikuchi (菊地 毅, born 1964), a Japanese professional wrestler
Tsuyoshi Kitazawa (北澤 豪, born 1968), a Japanese football player
Tsuyoshi Kohsaka (高阪 剛, born 1970), a Japanese mixed martial arts fighter
Tsuyoshi Kotogaume (琴ヶ梅 剛史, born 1963), a Japanese sumo wrestler
Tsuyoshi Kusanagi (草彅 剛, born 1974), a Japanese actor and a member of the idol group SMAP
Tsuyoshi Makino (牧野 剛, 1945–2016), a Japanese author
Tsuyoshi Midorikawa (緑川 毅志, born 1985), a Kazakh manga artist
Tsuyoshi Mienoumi (三重ノ海 剛司, born 1948), a Japanese sumo wrestler and 57th yokozuna
Tsuyoshi Nagabuchi (長渕 剛, born 1956), a Japanese singer-songwriter
Tsuyoshi Nakaima (なかいま強, born 1960), a Japanese manga artist
Tsuyoshi Nakasako (中迫 剛, born 1974), a Japanese professional kickboxer
Tsuyoshi Nishioka (西岡 剛, born 1984), a Japanese professional baseball player
Tsuyoshi Ogata (尾方 剛, born 1973), a Japanese long-distance runner
Tsuyoshi Ōhashi (大橋, 剛志, born 1971), a Japanese manga artist 
Tsuyoshi Sekito (関戸 剛, born 1963), a Japanese video game music composer, arranger and performer
, Japanese footballer
Tsuyoshi Shinjo (新庄 剛志, born 1970), a Japanese professional baseball outfielder
Tsuyoshi Suzuki, a Japanese DJ and the co-founder of the label Matsuri Productions
Tsuyoshi Takagi (高木 毅, born 1956), a Japanese politician
Tsuyoshi Takashiro (高城 剛, born 1964), a Japanese DJ, filmmaker, and writer
, Japanese footballer
Tsuyoshi Tezuka (手塚 強, born 1975), a Japanese professional drifting driver
Tsuyoshi Tochinoshin (栃ノ心 剛史, born 1987), a Georgian sumo wrestler
, Japanese alpine skier
Tsuyoshi Tsutsumi (堤 剛, born 1942), a Japanese cellist
Tsuyoshi Wada (和田 毅, born 1981), a Japanese baseball player
, Japanese footballer
, Japanese jazz pianist and composer
Tsuyoshi Yamanaka (山中 毅, 1939–2017), Japanese freestyle swimmer
, Japanese swimmer
, Japanese golfer
Tsuyoshi Yoshitake (吉武 剛, born 1981), a Japanese football player

Fictional characters
Tsuyoshi Ohki (大木 剛), a character in the manga and anime series Kodomo no Omocha
Tsuyoshi Kaijo (海城 剛), the lead character in the tokusatsu series Himitsu Sentai Goranger
Tsuyoshi Utada (歌田 強), a character in anime series Machine Robo Rescue.
Tsuyoshi Nakanojo (中之条 剛), a character in the manga and anime series Nichijou
Tsuyoshi Saigo (西郷 強), a character from the manga Little Ghost Q-Taro
Tsuyoshi Watanabe (渡辺 つよし), a character in Dragons Rioting.
Tsuyoshi “Hunk” Garrett, a character in Dreamworks’ Netflix show Voltron: Legendary Defender
Tsuyoshi Minami (南 烈), a fictional character of Japanese basketball manga Slam Dunk
Tsuyoshi Yamada (山田 剛司), from Densha Otoko

Japanese masculine given names